The 2017 season of the astronomy TV show Star Gazers starring Dean Regas and James Albury started on January 2, 2017.  The episodes from this season were listed as being an original production of WPBT2 South Florida PBS and were copyrighted to South Florida PBS, Inc.

2017 season

References

External links 
  Star Gazer official website
 

Lists of Jack Horkheimer: Star Gazer episodes
2017 American television seasons